Selim Sırrı Tarcan Sport Hall is an indoor arena for volleyball matches located in Altındağ district of Ankara, Turkey. Named after Selim Sırrı Tarcan (1874-1956), founder of the National Olympic Committee of Turkey and a major contributor to volleyball sport in Turkey, the venue has a seating capacity of 2,500 spectators.

Designed by architect Gündüz Güngen, its construction began in 1958 and completed in 1964. The sport hall was commissioned by the Turkish State Railways (TCDD), however it was handed over to the Directorate of Physical Education after 5–6 months of its opening. In April 2006, the venue was transferred to the Turkish Volleyball Federation for a time span of 49 years.

The venue is home to İller Bankası Women's Volleyball, which plays in the Turkish Women's Volleyball League.

Gallery

References 

Sports venues in Ankara
Sports venues completed in 1964
Volleyball venues in Turkey
Indoor arenas in Turkey
Altındağ, Ankara